Novofyodorovka is a rural locality (a settlement) in Novoilyinsky Selsoviet, Khabarsky District, Altai Krai, Russia. The population was 2 as of 2013. It was founded in 1911. There is 1 street.

Geography 
Novofyodorovka is located 55 km northwest of Khabary (the district's administrative centre) by road.

References 

Rural localities in Khabarsky District